Old Indonesia derby also known as The Indonesian Classic is the name given to the Indonesian football club match between Persija Jakarta and Persib Bandung. It is considered the biggest rivalry in Indonesian football, and one of the biggest in Asia.

The two clubs come from different regions, Persija Jakarta is a club that comes from Jakarta is the capital city of Indonesia and Persib Bandung is a club that comes from Bandung is the capital city of West Java. The club is one of the founders of the Football Association of Indonesia (Persatuan Sepakbola Seluruh Indonesia) with successful achievements in Indonesian football.

The first matches of intensity were in 1933 and 1934 when the two clubs competed in the final match at the Perserikatan. After that, competition between clubs did not increase too much because Persija Jakarta was a club from an urban city that did not get support and was different from Persib Bandung with its traditional regional supporters who developed along with the club's achievements, but after the formation of a professional league in Indonesia in 1994, the supporters group in Indonesia began to develop and Persija Jakarta began to build a supporters group which is now increasing.

In the early 2000s until now the rivalry has increased because of the hooliganism of both their supporters and the frequent involvement between the two clubs. The rivalry intensified again when their fan animosity was made into a film entitled Romeo and Juliet (Indonesian version) in 2009, a romance that was limited to the enmity of football fans. The match between them became an interesting spectacle in football in Indonesia with statistics and prestige between the clubs.

Origin 
Before Indonesia's independence, in 1930 a football association in Indonesia called the Inlandsche Stedenwedstrden was held, the football clubs Persib Bandung and Persija Jakarta met several times, but the matches were normal. After Indonesia's independence, clubs in Indonesia began to form again and a football association in Indonesia was again organized called the Perserikatan in 1950 to 1995. At that time meetings between the two clubs were also rare, Persib Bandung had several hot matches but with PSMS Medan, the competition they can be called a classic derby, Persib Bandung several times stepped into the final which was held at the Gelora Bung Karno Stadium and their supporters always filled the stands, Persija Jakarta at that time did not have many fans, until in the late 1990s Persija Jakarta fans were formed, in the 2000s clashes between supporters often occurred and caused problems, here the competition spread to teams and clubs until now many events occur.

Results

Official match results 

Source:

Data Incomplete

Perserikatan era

Liga Indonesia era

Head-to-head results overall
As of 11 January 2023

Records 
Data from 2007-08 Liga Indonesia Premier DivisionAs 10 July 2019

Most appearances
 Players in bold are still active

Top goalscorer
 Players in bold are still active

Clean sheet
 Players in bold are still active

Men in both teams
Note: 
 Since Liga Indonesia era (1994–present)
 Players in bold are still active

Players who played for both clubs

Persija then Persib

Persib then Persija

Head coaches who coached for both clubs
 
source:

Honours

Supporters
Their supporters have never met after the start of hostilities between supporters of Persija and Persib in the 2000s, to date. Many conflicts occur including the death of one of the supporters and clashes which resulted in injury.

Persija Jakarta
Persija's supporters are called the Jakmania, founded in 1997 by Gugun Gondrong and Ferry Indra Sjarif. The Jakmania is one of the biggest football fan groups in Indonesia and use orange as its main colour, even though the club have since switched to red.

Persib Bandung
Persib Bandung fans often refer to themselves as Bobotoh. This name comes from the Sundanese language and literally means "a group of people who provide support, spirit and encouragement to those on the pitch". The most famous group of Persib supporters are the Viking Persib Club.

Deaths of fans 
The rivalry has led to the death of many fans of both sides. On March 5, 2012, when Persija were hosting Persib, Rangga Cipta Nugraha was beaten to death with a stadium bench by home fans after he celebrated a Persib goal. Rangga did not stop bleeding even when he was buried.

Another tragedy happened on September 23, 2018, when before the match began at the Gelora Bandung Lautan Api Stadium, Haringga Sirla, a Jakmania member, was killed by some unscrupulous Vikings. Condolences for Haringga also flowed from the netizens throughout social media. In response to the incident, the Football Association of Indonesia (PSSI) forced Persib to pay a IDR 100 million (US$6,634) fine and play the remainder of their home matches of the 2018 season behind closed doors.

Reconciliation
Until now, many parties want these two supporters to unite, but there are still many who provoke either from The Jakmania or Bobotoh, whether on social media or in real life. The dark past makes these two supporters difficult to unite, even to the point that there is a slogan, "Biarkan Permusuhan Ini Tetap Abadi", which means, "Let This Feud Remain Eternal" from one of the main figure Bobotoh frontman.

Following the Kanjuruhan Stadium disaster, Persija and Persib supporters participating in prayer ceremonies in Jakarta and Bandung while proudly wearing the club's attribute. Several subgroups of both sides declared to reduce aggressive fanaticism and promote a safe atmosphere at that moment.

See also
Sports rivalry
List of association football rivalries
Nationalism and sport
Liga 1 (Indonesia)
Eastern Green and Western Green Derby

Notes

References

Football rivalries in Indonesia
Persija Jakarta
Persib Bandung
Indonesia Super League
Sport in Jakarta